Er Dong, directed by Yang Jin, is a 2008 narrative independent Chinese film about a rebellious teenager in rural northern China. The film is shot in documentary-style and is the director's second feature.

Plot
Er Dong and his Christian mother lives in a rural Chinese village. She sends him to a Christian boarding school because of his inappropriate behavior, hoping that God will give him a new direction in life. At the school, Er meets a girl, Chang'e, and they are almost expelled because of their misconduct.

Festivals
 Rotterdam International Film Festival
 Pusan International Film Festival
 Hong Kong International Film Festival

External links
 
 Er Dong on dGenerate Films website

2008 films
Chinese independent films
2000s Mandarin-language films
2008 drama films
2008 independent films
Chinese drama films